David Scott (1848 – 10 January 1927) was an Australian politician, elected as a member of the New South Wales Legislative Assembly.

Scott  was born at Newcastle-on-Tyne, England and began work in a brickfield when ten years old.  He served apprenticeship as an ironmoulder.  He travelled to New South Wales in 1874 and settled in Newcastle and became a foreman ironmoulder with the Rodgers engineering works.  He spent two years in California.  He married Margaret Malone in  about 1878 and they had issue three daughters and six sons.

Scott was elected as the member for Newcastle in 1891, but was defeated in 1894.  In 1917 he married for the second time to Emma Roe, but they had no children.  He died in the Newcastle suburb of Adamstown.

References

 

Members of the New South Wales Legislative Assembly
Protectionist Party politicians
1848 births
1927 deaths